William Bromwell Melish (July 28, 1852 - October 21, 1927) was the President of Bromwell Brush and Wire Goods in Cincinnati and a Freemason leader. He was the Grand Master of the Grand Encampment of Knights Templar of the United States from 1910 to 1913.

Biography

In 1916, Melish was elected president of the Cincinnati Chamber of Commerce.

He died on October 21, 1927 and was interred in Spring Grove Cemetery in Cincinnati, Ohio.

References

1852 births
1927 deaths
Burials at Spring Grove Cemetery